Lovill Bluff is a rock and snow coastal bluff at the western end of Siple Island, off the coast of Marie Byrd Land, Antarctica. It was mapped by United States Geological Survey from surveys and U.S. Navy air photos, 1959–65, and was named by the Advisory Committee on Antarctic Names for James E. Lovill, the United States Antarctic Research Program meteorologist-in-charge at Byrd Station in 1965.

References

Cliffs of Marie Byrd Land